Francine Fox (born March 16, 1949) is an American sprint canoer who competed in the mid-1960s. She won a silver medal in the K-2 500 m event at the 1964 Summer Olympics in Tokyo with her K-2 partner Glorianne Perrier.

Fox was born in Washington, D.C.

References
 

1949 births
American female canoeists
Canoeists at the 1964 Summer Olympics
Olympic silver medalists for the United States in canoeing
Sportspeople from Washington, D.C.
Living people
Medalists at the 1964 Summer Olympics
21st-century American women